The following elections occurred in the year 1810.

Europe
 1810 Spanish general election

North America

United States
 1810 New York gubernatorial election
 United States House of Representatives elections in New York, 1810
 1810 and 1811 United States House of Representatives elections
 1810 and 1811 United States Senate elections

See also
 :Category:1810 elections

1810
Elections